Erbium(III) acetate is the acetate salt of erbium, with the proposed chemical formula of Er(CH3COO)3. It can be used to synthesize some optical materials.

Physical properties
The tetrahydrate of erbium(III) acetate is thermally decomposed at 90 °C, giving a proposed anhydride:
 Er(CH3COO)3·4H2O → Er(CH3COO)3 + 4 H2O
Continued heating to 310 °C will form ketene:
 Er(CH3COO)3 → Er(OH)(CH3COO)2 + CH2=C=O
At 350 °C, the proposed Er(OH)(CH3COO)2 loses acetic acid to yield a material of the formula ErOCH3COO, forming Er2O2CO3 at 390 °C, finally obtaining Er2O3 at 590 °C.

References

Erbium compounds
Acetates